The Irish League in season 1959–60. It was contested by 12 teams, and Glenavon won the championship.

League standings

Results

References
Northern Ireland - List of final tables (RSSSF)

NIFL Premiership seasons
1959–60 in Northern Ireland association football
North